Harbor Beach is a city in Huron County in the U.S. state of Michigan. The population was 1,604 at the 2020 census.

History
The earliest settlers to this area arrived in 1837 and established a sawmill for processing lumber.  The settlement eventually was named Barnettsville in 1855, as the settlement continued to grow, the town was renamed Sand Beach.  In 1899, the village of Sand Beach changed its name to Harbor Beach, because of the impression that the area has nothing but sand.  In 1910, it was officially incorporated into a city.

Located on the eastern shore of Lake Huron in the Thumb of Michigan, Harbor Beach is known as having the world's largest man-made fresh water harbor and boasts a fishing pier that is handicap accessible.  The municipal marina provides transient services and shuttle services into the downtown area which has retained its old town charm.

The association known as HBRA was founded in 1896 as a summertime vacation spot in Harbor Beach.  The resort is located roughly three hours north of Detroit, MI and is currently still operated, and frequented, by the 5th and 6th generation descendants of the original founding families.

Harbor Beach won the 2012 Division 8 State Football Championship.

Geography
The world's largest man-made fresh water harbor offers a harbor of refuge to ships traveling between Port Huron and Pointe Aux Barques.
It is considered to be part of the Thumb of Michigan, which in turn is a subregion of the Flint/Tri-Cities region.
The two main state highways are M-25 and M-142.

Demographics

2010 census
As of the census of 2010, there were 1,703 people, 774 households, and 454 families residing in the city. The racial makeup of the city was 96.4% White, 0.2% African American, 0.4% Native American, 1.1% Asian, 0.2% from other races, and 1.8% from two or more races. Hispanic or Latino of any race were 0.6% of the population.

There were 774 households, of which 24.0% had children under the age of 18 living with them, 43.8% were married couples living together, 11.2% had a female householder with no husband present, 3.6% had a male householder with no wife present, and 41.3% were non-families. 37.9% of all households were made up of individuals, and 22.2% had someone living alone who was 65 years of age or older. The average household size was 2.14 and the average family size was 2.80.

The median age in the city was 47.7 years. 20.4% of residents were under the age of 18; 7.4% were between the ages of 18 and 24; 19.5% were from 25 to 44; 29.9% were from 45 to 64; and 22.7% were 65 years of age or older. The gender makeup of the city was 47.5% male and 52.5% female.

2000 census
As of the census of 2000, there were 1,837 people, 774 households, and 503 families residing in the city. The racial makeup of the city was 96.35% White, 0.11% African American, 0.49% Native American, 1.36% Asian, 0.38% from other races, and 1.31% from two or more races. Hispanic or Latino of any race were 0.93% of the population.

There were 774 households, out of which 29.5% had children under the age of 18 living with them, 51.4% were married couples living together, 10.2% had a female householder with no husband present, and 34.9% were non-families. 32.3% of all households were made up of individuals, and 16.8% had someone living alone who was 65 years of age or older.  The average household size was 2.31 and the average family size was 2.92.

In the city, the population was spread out, with 24.5% under the age of 18, 6.8% from 18 to 24, 23.8% from 25 to 44, 22.9% from 45 to 64, and 22.1% who were 65 years of age or older.  The median age was 42 years. For every 100 females, there were 91.4 males.  For every 100 females age 18 and over, there were 86.9 males.

The median income for a household in the city was $29,469, and the median income for a family was $35,263. Males had a median income of $29,938 versus $18,864 for females. The per capita income for the city was $14,917.  About 11.2% of families and 15.1% of the population were below the poverty line, including 24.8% of those under age 18 and 12.2% of those age 65 or over.

Climate

Notable people
 Frank Murphy, Mayor of Detroit, last Governor General of the Philippine Islands and the first High Commissioner of the Philippines, Governor of Michigan, United States Attorney General, and Associate Justice of the Supreme Court of the United States.
 Dick Lange, Major League Baseball pitcher, California Angels
 James H. Lincoln, Detroit City councilman, Michigan judge, author of Anatomy of a Riot and Fiery Trail
 Louis J. Sebille, World War II and Korean War pilot, posthumous Medal of Honor recipient

Government
The government of Harbor Beach is organized under the City Charter of 1965 and operates under a Mayor/Council form of government.  The City Council consists of the Mayor, who is elected every two years, and four Council members, who are elected for four-year terms.

Mayor Gary Booms
Mayor Pro-Tem Al Kleinknecht
Councilmember Bob Swartz
Councilmember Matt Woodke
Councilmember Sam Capling
Harbor Beach has a sister city in Canada:

Attractions

The Harbor Beach Light is located at the end of the north breakwater entrance to the harbor of refuge, created by the U.S. Army Corps of Engineers, protecting the harbor of Harbor Beach, Michigan. Tours are available on Saturdays during the summer.
The Harbor Beach Community House is located at the main intersection in Harbor Beach.  On the west face of the building is a mural that depicts local historical scenes and figures, including representations of agriculture, Frank Murphy, shipwrecks, locomotives, and much more.
The Grice House Museum offers a glimpse at life in the past, while preserving history for future generations.
 Frank Murphy Memorial Museum and home.  The birthplace of Frank Murphy and law office of Murphy's father.
 The Harbor Beach open-air Farmers Market is open on the grounds of the historic Frank Murphy's Museum from 2:00 P.M. until 7:00 P.M. every Friday during the summer months through October 7.
 The Thumb’s #1 Music Store - Expedition Music Store.

Education
Harbor Beach Community Schools
Harbor Beach Elementary School
Harbor Beach Middle School
Harbor Beach High School
Our Lady Of Lake Huron School
Zion Lutheran School

Registered Historic Places

See also
Shipwrecks of the 1913 Great Lakes storm

Notes

External links
Harbor Beach Chamber of Commerce.
City of Harbor Beach website.

 
Cities in Huron County, Michigan
1837 establishments in Michigan
Populated places on Lake Huron in the United States